Maoricicada nigra is a species of cicada that is endemic to New Zealand. This species was first described by John Golding Myers in 1921.

Subspecies
There are two subspecies:
Maoricicada nigra frigida Dugdale & Fleming, 1978 – eastern subnival cicada
Maoricicada nigra nigra (Myers, 1921) – western subnival cicada

References

Cicadidae
Cicadas of New Zealand
Insects described in 1921
Endemic fauna of New Zealand
Endemic insects of New Zealand